Manuel Pareja Obregón (4 May 1933 – 24 July 1995) was a Spanish musician and composer who focussed on Andalusian folk music.

Spanish composers
Spanish male composers
1933 births
1995 deaths
20th-century composers
20th-century Spanish musicians
20th-century Spanish male musicians